State v. Strasburg, 110 P. 1020 (Wash. 1910), was a case decided by the Washington Supreme Court that held that a statute eliminating the insanity defense was unconstitutional.  The court likened the exclusion of evidence of insanity to a denial of trial by jury.

Martin Strasburg, described as "an unknown and penniless stranger", was convicted of assault after shooting Otto Peeck in a saloon in Seattle. Lawyers saw the Strasburg case as an opportunity to have the Washington law that forbade insanity defenses declared unconstitutional. The effect of the Supreme Court declaring the law unconstitutional was said to be expected to reverse the convictions of "scores" of people.

References

External links
  

U.S. state criminal case law
1910 in United States case law
Washington (state) state case law
1910 in Washington (state)
United States jury case law
Insanity-related case law
Mental health law in the United States